Tuteh Chal (also Romanized as Tūteh Chāl; also known as Tūtehcheh, Tūteh Chāy, Tūtahchāi, Tutakhchay, and Tūtchāl) is a village in Dastjerd Rural District, Alamut-e Gharbi District, Qazvin County, Qazvin Province, Iran. At the 2006 census, its population was 76, in 20 families.

References 

Populated places in Qazvin County